Copeland is a city in Gray County, Kansas, United States.  As of the 2020 census, the population of the city was 251.

History
Copeland was founded in 1912. It was named for E. L. Copeland, an official of the Santa Fe Railroad.

The first post office in Copeland was established in October 1912.

Geography
Copeland is located at  (37.540199, -100.630236).

Demographics

2010 census
As of the census of 2010, there were 310 people, 112 households, and 87 families residing in the city. The racial makeup of the city was 96.1% White, 1.6% African American, 0.3% Native American, and 1.9% from other races. Hispanic or Latino of any race were 5.2% of the population.

There were 112 households, of which 36.6% had children under the age of 18 living with them, 71.4% were married couples living together, 1.8% had a female householder with no husband present, 4.5% had a male householder with no wife present, and 22.3% were non-families. 20.5% of all households were made up of individuals, and 8.9% had someone living alone who was 65 years of age or older. The average household size was 2.77 and the average family size was 3.25.

The median age in the city was 37.3 years. 30.3% of residents were under the age of 18; 7.7% were between the ages of 18 and 24; 23.3% were from 25 to 44; 25.5% were from 45 to 64; and 13.2% were 65 years of age or older. The gender makeup of the city was 54.2% male and 45.8% female.

2000 census
As of the census of 2000, there were 339 people, 122 households, and 86 families residing in the city. The racial makeup of the city was 91.15% White, 2.06% Native American, 6.49% from other races, and 0.29% from two or more races. Hispanic or Latino of any race were 9.73% of the population.

There were 122 households, out of which 42.6% had children under the age of 18 living with them, 63.9% were married couples living together, 4.9% had a female householder with no husband present, and 28.7% were non-families. 26.2% of all households were made up of individuals, and 11.5% had someone living alone who was 65 years of age or older. The average household size was 2.78 and the average family size was 3.44.

In the city, the population was spread out, with 34.5% under the age of 18, 7.4% from 18 to 24, 29.8% from 25 to 44, 18.0% from 45 to 64, and 10.3% who were 65 years of age or older. The median age was 30 years. For every 100 females, there were 115.9 males. For every 100 females age 18 and over, there were 101.8 males.

The median income for a household in the city was $35,625, and the median income for a family was $38,594. Males had a median income of $31,458 versus $21,250 for females. The per capita income for the city was $15,615. About 11.3% of families and 14.8% of the population were below the poverty line, including 21.6% of those under age 18 and none of those age 65 or over.

Education
South Gray Schools consists of Copeland USD 476 and Montezuma USD 371. They include an Elementary school and Junior High School in Copeland, and an Elementary and High School in Montezuma.

Prior to school unification, Copeland was home to Copeland High School, which had a mascot known as the Vikings.

References

Further reading

External links

 Copeland - Directory of Public Officials
 USD 371, local school district
 Copeland City Map, KDOT

Cities in Kansas
Cities in Gray County, Kansas